Coast to Coast is the second EP by Australian pop singer Cody Simpson. It was released on 20 September 2011 by Atlantic Records and Warner Records. Simpson announced the release date on Twitter on 18 July 2011. Of the six tracks, Simpson only co-wrote two, while the other four were written by staffwriters.

Background
Simpson announced the release date of the EP as Coast to Coast on Twitter on 18 July 2011, the same name as his current tour. "All Day" was also included on the Australian version of the EP.

Several lyric videos have been made for songs from the EP; the lyric video to "Angel" was uploaded to YouTube on 10 September; lyric video of "Not Just You" was uploaded on 16 September. "Not Just You" was originally composed and sung by Nasri Atweh in 2009, and "Crazy But True" was uploaded on 24 September.

On 17 September, the full EP became available to stream on Cody's official website. On 21 September 2011, "Not Just You" was the #1 free single on iTunes.

Tour
Simpson had gone on tour promoting Coast to Coast, making stops at various Malls in the United States. From 6 August 2011 to 18 September 2011 he took part in the Coast to Coast Mall Tour. It started in Lake Grove, New York at the Smith Haven Mall and ended in Los Angeles, California at The Block at Orange.

Singles
"On My Mind" is the first song to be released from this EP. The song was written by Julie Frost, Fraser T Smith, Mike Caren and Nasri. It was released on 23 April 2011. It was released on iTunes 23 May 2011. The song reached #32 on the U.S. Social Chart. The music video was released on 17 June 2011. The video was directed by Travis Kopach, and features dancer/actress Hailey Baldwin. In September, Simpson released.

"Not Just You". The music video for "Not Just You" was released on 11 October 2011, directed by Roman White. The video was filmed on Venice Beach, and in downtown L.A. "Angel" is the third single from the album. It was released on 16 December 2011, and the music video was directed by Cody Simpson and Matt Graham.

Track listing

Commercial performance
In the United States, the EP debuted at number 12 on the Billboard 200 chart with 24,000 copies sold in its first week. In Australia, the album debuted at number 26 on the Australian Albums Chart and rose to number 16 the following week.

References

Cody Simpson albums
Atlantic Records EPs
Albums produced by Danja (record producer)
Albums produced by the Messengers (producers)
2011 EPs